Dewstow House, Caldicot, Monmouthshire, Wales, is an early nineteenth century villa in a Neoclassical style. The house is notable as the site of "one of the strangest gardens in Wales." The building itself is plain; described by architectural writer John Newman as a "simple three-bay villa", it has extensive views over the Severn Estuary. The house is a Grade II listed building, while the garden is listed at the highest grade, Grade I, on the Cadw/ICOMOS Register of Parks and Gardens of Special Historic Interest in Wales.

History and description
Dewstow House is a simple, two-storey villa. It is notable for its  "network of very rare and unusual underground gardens" constructed in the late nineteenth and early twentieth centuries. Comprising "underground passages and top-light chambers with artificial rock-work and stalactities," the garden structures have three separate Grade II* listings as a result of their importance. 

After the death of the garden's creator, Harry Oakley, in 1940, the gardens were gradually abandoned. In the 1960s, during the construction of the M4 motorway and the Severn Bridge, soil from these sites was used to fill in the grottoes and pools. The gardens were rediscovered, excavated and restored at the beginning of the twenty first century and are now open to the public. They are registered Grade I on the Cadw/ICOMOS Register of Parks and Gardens of Special Historic Interest in Wales.

Gallery

Notes

References

External links 

Dewstow Gardens & Grottoes official website.
Parks & Gardens UK.
Dewstow Gardens info on Pulham.org.uk.
Gardens and Grottoes. The story so far.

Grade II listed buildings in Monmouthshire
Grade II* listed buildings in Monmouthshire
Country houses in Monmouthshire
Registered historic parks and gardens in Monmouthshire